United Nations Security Council Resolution 2249 was unanimously adopted on 20 November 2015. It notably calls upon all Member States to redouble their efforts against both ISIL and the al-Nusra Front as well as other al-Qaeda affiliates as designated by the Security Council.

Resolution 
The resolution "unequivocally condemns in the strongest terms the horrifying terrorist attacks perpetrated by ISIL, also known as Da'esh", mentioning the June 2015 attack in Sousse, the October 2015 attack in Ankara, the October 2015 attack over Sinaï, the November 2015 Beirut attack and the November 2015 Paris attacks.

It calls upon "Member States that have the capacity to do so to take all necessary measures, in compliance with international law, (...) international human rights, refugee and humanitarian law (...) to redouble and coordinate their efforts to prevent and suppress terrorist acts committed specifically by ISIL also known as Da’esh as well as ANF, and all other individuals, groups, undertakings, and entities associated with al-Qaeda, and other terrorist groups, as designated by the United Nations Security Council."

See also 
 Al-Qaida Sanctions Committee
 List of United Nations Security Council Resolutions 2201 to 2300

References

External links
Text of the Resolution at undocs.org
Resolution 2249 - Legitimized Self-Defence - A Comment by Paulina Starski

2015 United Nations Security Council resolutions
November 2015 events
United Nations Security Council resolutions concerning terrorism
History of the Islamic State of Iraq and the Levant
Al-Nusra Front